Natatorium Park was a park in Spokane, Washington. It was originally the site of Ingersoll Park where a baseball field was built and became known as Twickenham Park, for the neighborhood that developed around it, until the natatorium was built. The swimming facility closed in 1968.

It used heated saltwater from the Spokane River. A greenhouse and gardens were added. It was switched to well water. The song “Dear Old Nat” by A. D. Scammell was written about it. Amusements were added.  The site is now a trailer park.

KSPS aired the documentary Remember When: Nat Park in 1996.

References

External links
 Natatorium Park website

Parks in Spokane County, Washington
Baseball in Washington (state)
Amusement parks closed in 1967
Amusement parks in Washington (state)